The following are the association football events of the year 1948 throughout the world.

Events

Clubs reformed in 1948

Weston-super-Mare A.F.C.
CSKA Sofia

Winners club national championship

Argentina
Independiente

Austria
Rapid Vienna

Bulgaria
CSKA Sofia

Chile
Audax Italiano

Colombia
Santa Fe

Costa Rica
Herediano

East Germany
SG Planitz

England
for fuller coverage see 1947–48 in English football
First Division: Arsenal
Second Division: Birmingham City
Third Division North: Lincoln City
Third Division South: Queens Park Rangers
FA Cup: Manchester United

France
Olympique de Marseille

Hong Kong
Kitchee

Iceland
KR

Italy
Torino F.C.

Mexico
León

Paraguay
Olimpia Asunción

Poland
Cracovia

Romania
Divizia A: ITA Arad
Divizia B: Dezrobirea Constanța, Metalochimic București, Politehnica Timișoara, Phoenix Baia Mare
Cupa României: ITA Arad

Scotland
for fuller coverage see 1947–48 in Scottish football
League Division A: Hibernian
League Division B: East Fife
League Division C: East Stirlingshire
Scottish Cup: Rangers
Scottish League Cup: East Fife

Spain
Barcelona

Sweden
IFK Norrköping

Switzerland
AC Bellinzona

Uruguay
Nacional

USSR
CSKA Moscow

Yugoslavia
Dinamo Zagreb

International tournaments
1948 British Home Championship (4 October 1947 – 10 May 1948)

Olympic Games in London, United Kingdom (31 July – 13 August 1948)

Births
 21. January – Zygmunt Kukla, Polish international footballer (died 2016)
 24 January – Heinz Flohe, German international footballer (died 2013)
 31 January – Volkmar Groß, German international footballer (died 2014)
 24 February 
 Luis Galvan, Argentinian international footballer
 Walter Smith, Scottish footballer and manager (died 2021)
 5 March – Jan van Beveren, Dutch footballer (died 2011)
 22 March – Bernard Dietz, German international footballer
 28 March – Walter Balmer, Swiss international footballer (died 2010)
 29 March – Roberto Abrussezze, Brazilian footballer
 27 April – Josef Hickersberger, Austrian international footballer and coach
 17 May – Horst Köppel, Germann international footballer and manager
 1 July – Ever Hugo Almeida, Uruguayan-Paraguayan football player and manager
 15 August – Patrice Rio, French footballer
 2 October – Trevor Brooking, English international footballer
 7 December – Roland Hattenberger, Austrian international footballer
 12 December – Colin Todd, English footballer and manager
 31 December – Sandy Jardine, Scottish international footballer and manager (died 2014)

Deaths

 
Association football by year